Echinodorus grisebachii or Echinodorus amazonicus is commonly known as Amazon sword plant, although other plants are also known under this common name. The aquatic plant is cultivated for and used in ponds and artificial aquatic habitats. It is native to Cuba, Central America, and South America as far south as Brazil and Bolivia. It has been sold under the name Paniculatus.

Description

An aquatic plant with submergent leaves 40 – 60 cm long attached by petioles flatly triangular. Leaf blades are lanceolate or narrowly oval.

There are a number of cultivated forms in the trade with various names such as "Black" or "'Parviflorus".

References

External links
  Tropica
 An Integrative Approach to Species Delimitation in Echinodorus (Alismataceae) and the Description of Two New Species  -  Samuli Lehtonen
  TFH article

grisebachii
Flora of the Amazon
Flora of Brazil
Flora of Cuba
Flora of Costa Rica
Flora of Honduras
Flora of Nicaragua
Flora of French Guiana
Flora of Suriname
Flora of Venezuela
Flora of Bolivia
Flora of Colombia
Flora of Peru
Plants described in 1909
Aquatic plants
Flora without expected TNC conservation status